Jenny Murphy (born May 30, 1989) is a female rugby union player for . She was a member of the Ireland's 2014 Women's Rugby World Cup squad. She also played at the 2013 Rugby World Cup Sevens in Moscow, Russia.

As a child Murphy played Gaelic football and soccer. She played with Ballymore Eustace GAA during her crucial player development years but in 2001 signed a controversial transfer to Kilcullen GAA. Despite this she is still regarded as a local treasure of Ballymore and notably in their top five best athletes.

At the start of the 2018/19 season, Murphy started coaching the inaugural Naas RFC Women’s team alongside Leinster and Ireland U20’s player Adam Coyle. The team were promoted from Leinster Women’s League Division 4 to Division 3 in their breakthrough season.

Jenny is also a casual fill-in host for the SportsJOE.ie Baz and Andrew’s House of Rugby Podcast starring former Munster and Ireland centre Barry Murphy alongside Ireland and Ulster back Andrew Trimble.

References

1989 births
Living people
Female rugby union coaches
Irish female rugby union players
Ireland women's international rugby union players
Ireland international women's rugby sevens players
Old Belvedere R.F.C. players
Leinster Rugby women's players